Clarence Edward "Pug" Manders (May 5, 1913 – January 13, 1985) was a National Football League running back for the Brooklyn Dodgers/Tigers from 1939 through 1944. He led the NFL in rushing in 1941 and is the younger brother of Jack Manders.  His nickname was Pug.

References

1913 births
1985 deaths
American football fullbacks
American football halfbacks
Boston Yanks players
Brooklyn Dodgers (NFL) players
Brooklyn Tigers players
Buffalo Bills (AAFC) players
Drake Bulldogs football players
New York Yankees (AAFC) players
People from Milbank, South Dakota
Players of American football from South Dakota